Ellangowan may refer to:

Ellangowan (horse) (1920–after 1935), a racehorse
Ellangowan, Queensland, a locality in the Toowoomba Region, Australia
Ellangowan, a pseudonym of Scottish author James Glass Bertram (1824–1892)
Ellangowan, a fictitious location in Scotland in Walter Scott's novel Guy Mannering

See also
Ellengowan, Ontario, a community in Arran–Elderslie, Canada